Tréflez is a commune in the Finistère department of Brittany in north-western France.

Population
Inhabitants of Tréflez are called in French Tréfléziens.

People linked to Treflez
Pierre Pincemaille (1956-2018), French musician, is buried in the new cemetery of Treflez.

See also
Communes of the Finistère department
List of the works of Bastien and Henry Prigent

References

External links

Mayors of Finistère Association 

Communes of Finistère